Eoghan an Mhéirín Mac Cárthaigh (1691–1756) was an Irish poet and historian. Born in Aherla (in the parish or Kilbonane) in County Cork, Mac Cárthaigh was a Jacobite who wrote in support of Charles McCarthy (Cormac Spáinneach Mac Cárthaigh) during the Williamite War in Ireland.

See also
 Diarmuid mac Sheáin Bhuí Mac Cárthaigh,  d. 1705
 Dónall na Buile Mac Cárthaigh
 Liam Rua Mac Coitir, 1675/90?–1738.
 Donnchadh Ruadh Mac Conmara, 1715–1810.

References

Irish poets
Irish-language poets
People from County Cork
18th-century Irish people
1691 births
1756 deaths